Hiriberri/Villanueva de Aezkoa is a town and municipality located in the north of Navarre. It belongs to the Valley of Aezkoa, together with several villages.

References

External links
 HIRIBERRI/VILLANUEVA DE AEZKOA in the Bernardo Estornés Lasa - Auñamendi Encyclopedia (Euskomedia Fundazioa) 

Municipalities in Navarre